Jaturun Siripongs (October 19, 1951 – February 9, 1999) was a Thai national who was executed by the state of California for the December 1981 murders of two people during a robbery in Garden Grove, California. Siripongs maintained that he was involved in the robbery but was not the actual killer. Ultimately, he was convicted and sentenced to death in 1983 and was subsequently executed in 1999 at San Quentin State Prison by lethal injection.

Early life
Siripongs was born on October 19, 1951, in Thailand. He was born into poverty and was raised in a brothel after his parents separated. He was physically abused and grew up in a rat-infested compound without running water or electricity. At age 20, he was shot in the head while robbing a department store in Thailand. He was convicted for participating in the robbery and served time in a Thai prison. Following his release from prison for good behavior, he trained as a monk at a Buddhist monastery and then got a job as a cook on a cargo ship. He later aided the U.S. drug authorities in a sting operation and acquired money that allowed him to buy passage to the United States.

Murders
On December 15, 1981, the bodies of 36-year-old Packovan Wattanaporn and 52-year-old Quach Nguyen were found in the storeroom of a retail store in Garden Grove, California. Wattanaporn, the store manager, had been strangled, while Nguyen, an employee, had suffered multiple stab wounds to the head and neck.

Arrest and trial
On December 17, Siripongs attempted to make purchases using credit cards that belonged to Wattanaporn. Because of this, police arrested him and took him in for questioning. Bloodstains found at the crime scene matched Siripong's blood type, and he had multiple cuts on his fingers. It was then learned that Siripongs occasionally worked at the same retail store. A search of his car and home revealed he owned a knife that was similar to the weapon that had been used to kill Nguyen. Several pieces of Wattanaporn's jewelry were also discovered, and dried blood was found inside his car.

Siripongs was convicted of burglary, robbery, and two counts of first-degree murder. On April 22, 1983, an Orange County jury sentenced him to death.

Siripongs admitted that he took part in the robbery but always claimed the murders were committed by an accomplice he refused to name. His defense attorneys said his accomplice was the 17-year-old sister of his girlfriend, who was a key witness at his trial. She had since returned to Thailand, however. In December 1995, a federal judge conducted an eight-day hearing and found no evidence that supported the idea of Siripongs having an accomplice.

Execution
Siripongs was initially scheduled for execution in November 1998, but the execution was blocked by a federal judge. On December 14, 1998, an Orange County Superior Court Judge signed a new execution order for Siripongs, setting an execution date for February 9, 1999.

Multiple groups of people tried to appeal the execution, including Pope John Paul II, the husband of Wattanaporn who was a Buddhist, two of the jurors at his trial, and the former warden of San Quentin State Prison, who, despite attempting to spare Siripongs life, was a supporter of capital punishment. The government of Thailand also asked that Siripongs life be spared and that he return to his native country to serve a life sentence. Governor Gray Davis rejected the offer and denied Siripongs clemency. He stated "Model behavior cannot bring back the lives of the two innocent murder victims." Although many opposed the execution, some supported it, including Wattanaporn's son. At Siripongs' clemency hearing, he stated, "What he did, he should pay for."

On February 9, 1999, Siripongs was executed at San Quentin State Prison by lethal injection. His last meal consisted of two cans of Lucky Arctic iced tea and two cups of Mission Pride canned peaches. He had no last words, and was pronounced dead at 12:19 a.m. Outside San Quentin State Prison on the night of his execution, anti death penalty advocates clashed with death penalty supporters. Punches were thrown, causing Marin County police to separate the two groups. Throughout his time on death row, Siripongs was described as a model inmate, who believed he would be reincarnated following his execution. He wished to be cremated and have his ashes scattered at sea.

See also
 Capital punishment in California
 Capital punishment in the United States
 List of people executed in California
 Theerasak Longji

References

1951 births
1999 deaths
20th-century executions by California
Jaturun Siripongs
People convicted of murder by California
People executed by California by lethal injection
People executed for murder
Jaturun Siripongs